Triaxomera kurilensis is a moth of the family Tineidae. It found on the Kurile Islands.

References

Moths described in 1996
Nemapogoninae
Taxa named by Aleksei Konstantinovich Zagulyaev